The lactate permease (LctP) family (TC# 2.A.14) is a family of transport proteins belonging to the ion transporter (IT) superfamily.

Function 
Characterized members of this family possess 15-18 transmembrane segments (TMSs) and are roughly 460-565 amino acyl residues in length.

General transport reaction 
Transport reactions catalyzed by functionally characterized members of the LctP family include:D- or L-lactate or glycolate (out) + H+ (out) → D- or L-lactate or glycolate (in) + H+ (in).

References

Further reading 

 
 
 
 

Protein families
Solute carrier family